Cassinia nivalis commonly known as ochre cassinia, is a species of flowering plant in the family Asteraceae and is endemic to eastern Victoria, Australia. It is an erect shrub with hairy, deep reddish-purple branches, hairy, needle-shaped leaves, and cream-coloured to ochre heads of flowers arranged in a hemispherical corymb.

Description
The corymbs are hemispherical  in diameter with between eighty and one hundred heads.

Taxonomy and naming
Cassinia nivalis was first formally described in 2005 by Anthony Edward Orchard in Australian Systematic Botany from specimens collected by Cliff Beauglehole in the Barkly-Goulburn State Forest in 1985. The specific epithet (nivalis) means "snowy".

Distribution and habitat
Ochre cassinia grows in mountain forest and coastal woodland in eastern Victoria.

References

nivalis
Asterales of Australia
Plants described in 2005
Flora of Victoria (Australia)